Lunt is a village in Merseyside, England.

Lunt may also refer to:

Lunt (surname)
The Lunt, a residential area within the city of Wolverhampton, England
Lunt Roman Fort, in the province of Britannia
Lunt-Fontanne Theatre, a theatre in New York City
Lunt Silversmiths, an American manufacturer of fine sterling, silver-plate and stainless steel flatware
Mr. Lunt, a character from the Christian children's series VeggieTales
Cornelius Van Lunt, a character in Marvel Comics books